Calvary Christian School is a private Christian school located in Covington, Kentucky.  CCS is a ministry of Calvary Baptist Church located in Latonia, Kentucky.  It has approximately 400 students from Preschool to 12th grade.

History 
Calvary was founded in November 1973 under the leadership of Galen Call. Sixty-three students in grades 1-4 began the school year, soon to be joined by 35 kindergarten students one week later. Soon  were acquired south of Latonia on Taylor Mill Road. Ground-breaking for the new Calvary Christian School location occurred on July 7, 1974, and was completed in 1976.

Sports 
The mascot of Calvary Christian School is the Cougar. Calvary offers many different sports, e.g., volleyball, soccer, basketball, baseball, cheerleading, cross country, golf, tennis, swimming, softball, and archery. The Calvary Varsity baseball team won their conference in 2010 for the first time in school history.  Also on February 20, 2014, senior Sarah Roaden became the fourth girls basketball player in the history of Calvary Christian School to score 1,000 points on varsity.

External links
Official Website

Private high schools in Kentucky
Educational institutions established in 1973
Schools in Kenton County, Kentucky
Private middle schools in Kentucky
Private elementary schools in Kentucky
1973 establishments in Kentucky
Buildings and structures in Covington, Kentucky
Christian schools in Kentucky